Many places throughout the state of Indiana take their names from Native American indigenous languages. This list includes counties, townships and towns.  Some of the names have been 'anglicized', while others have been translated into English or French. The primary Native American languages in Indiana are Miami and Potawatomi; both are dialects of Algonquin. Some places names are derived from other native languages, such as Sauk, Shawnee, and Delaware, although these tribes were not originally found in Indiana.
The name of Indiana means 'land of the Indians' or "Indian Land."

Indigenous Tribes of Indiana
 
Miami
Wea - The Wea were a Miami-Illinois-speaking people.
Piankeshaw - The Piankeshaw, Piankashaw or Pianguichia Peoples are members of the Miami Indians.
Potawatomi - The Potawatomi call themselves Neshnabé.
Kickapoo - The Kickapoo People (Kickapoo: Kiikaapoa or Kiikaapoi) are an Algonquian-speaking people.
Mascouten
Shawnee, post 1794
Delaware, post 1818

Places

A
 Aubbeenaubbee was a leader among the Potawatomi in the Lake Maxinkuckee area. Chief Aubbeenaubbee was born in 1760.
 Aubbeenaubbee Township, Fulton County, Indiana, Potawatomi Indian village known as Aubenaubee in Jackson Township, Elkhart County.
 Aub-ben-naub-Bee Reserve, near Lake Mzinkuckee.

B
 Baugo is an Indian work meaning "devil river".
 Baugo Creek, in Elkhart County.
 Baugo Township, Elkhart County, Indiana

C
 Cayuga, Indiana, located in Vermillion County is named after the Cayuga people of New York.

D
 Delaware – is for the Delaware or Lenape people, who were moved to the area in the 1840s.
 Delaware County, Indiana

E
 Elkhart - The sources are not clear, one claim is the name comes from the Shawnee Indian Chief Elkhart (Mihsheweteha:Elk-heart).
 Elkhart County, Indiana
Elkhart Township, Noble County, Indiana
 Elkhart River is a tributary of the St. Joseph River in Elkhart County, Indiana.
 Eel River is a name for two rivers in Indiana.  One is a tributary of the Wabash River, the other a tributary of the White River.
 Erie Township, Miami County, Indiana is named for the Erie people, native to the Ohio, Pennsylvania and New York area.

H
Huron, Indiana - Named for Huron, Ohio, which comes from the Huron people.

I
 Iroquois - During the Beaver Wars the Iroquois Confederation campaigned in Indiana.
 Iroquois River 
 Iroquois Township, Newton County, Indiana is named for the Iroquois River

K
 Kankakee River - From a Miami-Illinois word teeyaahkiki, meaning: "Open country/exposed land/land in open/land exposed to view", in reference to the area's prior status as a marsh.
Kewanna was named for Kee-Wau-Nay, a Potawatomi chief.
Kokomo - Named for the Miami Ma-Ko-Ko-Mo who was called "Chief Kokomo".
 Kokomo, Indiana
 Indiana University Kokomo

M
 Man-Ke-Kosken Reserve
 Maumee River  -  Historically also known as the "Miami" in United States treaties with Native Americans. As early as 1671, French colonists called the river Miami du Lac, or Miami of the Lake (in contrast to the "Miami of the Ohio" or the Great Miami River, called in Miami-Illinois Ahsenisiipi). Maumee is an anglicized spelling of the Ottawa or Odawa name for the Miami tribe, Maamii. The Odawa had a village at the mouth of the Maumee River and occupied other territory in northwestern Ohio.
 Lake Maxinkuckee is from the Potawatomi word Mog-sin-ke-ki, which means "big stone country".
 Metea, Indiana is an Cass County community.  Chief Metea or Me-te-a (fl. 1812–1827) (Potawatomi: Mdewé "Sulks")
 Me-Nom-I-Nee Reserve
 Miami - named for the Miami, a Native American people, many of whom still live in this area. is named for the Miami, an Algonquian people who lived in the region.
 Miami County, Indiana
Great Miami River
 Mississinewa River - partly derived from the Miami Indian word namahchissinwi which means "falling waters" or "much fall in the water".
 Mishawaka - named after Shawnee Princess Mishawaka.
 Mongo -  Big Squaw
 Monons name is derived from the two creeks nearby, the Big Monon and the Little Monon. The spelling of the name of the creeks was formerly Monong, a Potawatomi word which one authority says meant "swift-running".
 Monon Bell
 Monon, Indiana
 Monon Township, White County, Indiana
 Monon Railroad
Monon Trail

N
 Nappanee, Indiana
  Nees-Waugh-Gee and Quash-Quas Reserve - Two leaders of the Potawatomi people in Elkhart County, Indiana.

O
Ohio River comes from the Seneca, Ohi:yo', lit. "Good River".
Osceola, Indiana was named after Osceola, leader of the Seminole.
Ouiatenon (Miami-Illinois: waayaahtanonki) was a dwelling place of members of the Wea tribe of Native Americans?  (See Wea below)
 Fort Ouiatenon is located along the Wabash River.

P
Patoka River comes from an Indian word meaning "log on bottom".
 Pottawattamie Park, Indiana is named for the Potawatomi, who occupied this area when it was settled.

S
 Salamonie is from the Miami-Illinois  'yellow paint'. They would make yellow paint from the bloodroot plant that grew along the river banks.
 Salamonie River
 Salamonie Township, Huntington County, Indiana is named for the Salamonie River.
 Shawnee
 Shawnee Township, Fountain County, Indiana
 Shawnee Township, Fountain County, Indiana
 Shipshewana - named after Potawatomi Chief Shipshewana

T
 Tippecanoe - is for the anglicization of "Kethtippecanoogi", a Miami people term meaning "place of the succor fish people."   or from the Miami-Illinois word for buffalo fish, reconstructed as */kiteepihkwana/.
 Tippecanoe County, Indiana 
 Tippecanoe Lake, Kosciusko County.
 Tippecanoe River
 Tippecanoe Township, Kosciusko County, Indiana is named for Tippecanoe River.
 Tippecanoe Township, Carroll County, Indiana is named for Tippecanoe River.
 Tippecanoe Township, Tippecanoe County, Indiana is named for Tippecanoe River.

V
 Vermillion - The French word vermilion is a translation of the Miami word "pe-auk-e-shaw," a name given to the Vermillion River because of the red earth found along their banks. This red earth, known as cinnabar, was used as a pigment. 
 Vermillion County, Indiana
 Vermilion River
 Vermillion Township, Vermillion County, Indiana

W
 Wabash - Named after the Wabash River, from a Miami Indian word, waapaahšiiki, meaning "it shines white", "pure white", or "water over white stones" 
Wabash, Indiana
Wabash County, Indiana
Wabash Township, Fountain County, Indiana is named for the Wabash River.
Wabash Township, Jay County, Indiana is named for the Wabash River.
Wabash Township, Tippecanoe County, Indiana is named for Wabash River.
Wakarusa, Indiana origin is not known. According to tradition, the name Wakarusa is from a Native American language, meaning "knee-deep in mud".
 Wanatah - named after the Potawatomi Chief Wanatah, meaning 'Knee Deep in Mud', "He who Charges His Enemies" or "The Charger".
 Wapahani High School - Wapahani is a Delaware Indian word for "White River".
 Lake Wawasee - named for Miami chief Wawasee (Wau-wuh-see), brother of Miami chief  Papakeecha, which translated means "Flat Belly."
Wea is from the Miami speaking group of native peoples living along the Wabash River around Lafayette, Indiana.  The French spelling is Oui, see Ouiatenon above.
Wea Township, Tippecanoe County, Indiana
 Winamac, Indiana, is named for  Winamac a Potawatomi chief.  The word is said to mean "catfish."
 Wyandot or Wyandotte - From Wyandot people, also known historically as the Huron.
Wyandot, Indiana
Wyandotte Cave
Wyandotte, Indiana took its name from Wyandotte Cave.

Y
Yellow River (Indiana) - derives from a translation of the Shawnee name for the river, We-thau-ka-mik, meaning "yellow waters"

See also 
List of place names in the United States of Native American origin
List of placenames of indigenous origin in the Americas
Native Americans in the United States

References

 
Place names of Native American origin in Indiana
Native American origin in Indiana
Native American
Native Americans in Indiana